Kal'a complex is located in Uzbekistan, in the town of Andijan at 40°45'30.3"N 72°22'12.7"E. It was built in 1880–1881 as a military fortress for troops of the Russian Empire. At present the department of manuscripts of works museum of literature and art of Andijan region is functioning here. Complex of national park named after Babur - Bog'i Bobur.

Buildings and structures in Uzbekistan